The Saskatchewan College of Physical Therapy is the organization charged with regulating the practice of physical therapy in the Canadian province of Saskatchewan. It was established in 1945, with the present regulatory act proclaimed in 1998. Since then, physical therapy is one of 29 professions in the province to be using a "standard act" and disciplinary procedure.

References

Colleges in Saskatchewan
Physiotherapy organizations